The Review-Mirror is a local weekly community newspaper based in Westport, Ontario, Canada. The newspaper also serves North Leeds, Rideau Valley and Rideau Lakes, and was established in 1893.

References

External links
The Review Mirror - Weekly newspaper for Westport, Ontario Rideau Valley and Rideau Lakes

Weekly newspapers published in Ontario
Leeds and Grenville United Counties
1895 establishments in Ontario
Publications established in 1895